Croydon East may refer to:

 East Croydon station, a rail and tram station in Croydon, London, England
 Croydon East (UK Parliament constituency), a former constituency in Croydon